Da Vinci School of Design and Architecture was established in the year 2012 in Chennai, India. The School conducts undergraduate studies in architecture. The school is on the Old Mahabalipuram Road in the vicinity of several industrial units. The department was headed by Ar babu. The School has its own library with a collection of publications.

References

Architecture schools in India
Universities and colleges in Chennai
Educational institutions established in 2012
2012 establishments in Tamil Nadu